Bruce P. Blake is a retired American bishop of the United Methodist Church, elected in 1988.

Family
Blake is from Wichita, Kansas, having graduated in 1955 from the Wichita East High School. In 1957 he married Karen Eileen Miers of Furley, Kansas, who has worked as personal secretary for doctors David and Vera Mace. The Blakes have three sons: Steven Keith, Scott Douglas, and Darin Paul; and four grandchildren.

Education
He graduated from Friends University, Wichita, and from Drew Theological Seminary, Madison, New Jersey, in 1962 cum laude.

Ordained ministry
He served a church in New Jersey while attending Drew.  Upon returning to Kansas (the Kansas West Annual Conference), he served the Ransom-Brownell U.M. Charge (1962–67).  He was pastor at Herington, Kansas (1967–69); then as the director of the first cooperative ministry in the Kansas West Conference:  the Tri-County Cooperative Ministry at Herington (1969–74).  He then served as senior pastor at Woodlawn U.M.C., Derby, Kansas (1974–84).  Bruce then served as president of Southwestern College, Winfield, Kansas (1984–88).

Episcopal ministry
Blake was elected to the episcopacy in 1988 by the South Central Jurisdictional Conference of the U.M. Church.  He was assigned to the Dallas Episcopal Area.  In 1996 he was assigned to the Oklahoma Area.  In retirement, the Blakes reside in Winfield, Kansas.

See also
List of bishops of the United Methodist Church

References

InfoServ, the official information service of The United Methodist Church.  
The Council of Bishops of the United Methodist Church

External links
"Bishop Bruce P. Blake". United Methodist Communication. Retrieved February 12, 2017.

Living people
Heads of universities and colleges in the United States
American United Methodist bishops
Friends University alumni
People from Winfield, Kansas
People from Derby, Kansas
Year of birth missing (living people)